The Atlantic Coast Conference softball tournament is the conference championship tournament in college softball for the Atlantic Coast Conference.  It is a single-elimination tournament, with seeding based on regular season records.  The winner receives the conference's automatic bid to the NCAA Division I Softball Championship each season.

Tournament
The ACC softball tournament is a single-elimination tournament held each year at various ACC campus stadiums. Thirteen of the fifteen current all-sport members of the conference sponsor softball. Miami (FL) and Wake Forest do not sponsor softball teams.  Duke softball began competing in the 2018 season. Clemson is replacing Women's Diving with Softball beginning the 2020 season.  The 2018 tournament features a first round in addition to quarterfinals, semifinals, and championship.  It is assumed that all 12 teams make the tournament, but no online source has been found specifying how many teams are in the first round.

Champions

Year-by-year

By school

Italics indicate school no longer sponsors softball in the ACC.

References

 
1992 establishments in Florida
Recurring sporting events established in 1992